EazyDraw is a Mac-only vector graphics program from Dekorra Optics. It has all of the usual vector drawing tools, but also includes features not usually combined (e.g., dimension tools, numerical parametric geometry, mathematical function graphing, image editing, etc.). Originally released in 2003 at the San Francisco MacWorld conference, versions have appeared regularly since. Version 1.7.0 was released in December 2004. Version 9.1.0, released in November 2018, was a major upgrade, and is fully compatible with macOS Mojave.

Several versions are available. In addition to the main macOS version, EazyDraw Retro is a 32-bit version that will run under macOS 10.4.11 through macOS 10.14, and can import many old formats, including PICT, AppleWorks, ClarisWorks, MacDraw, MacDraw II, and MacDraw Pro. A free version for iOS (and iPadOS) was first released in November 2019, with version 1.1 appearing in February 2020.

Export formats include PDF, EPS, SVG, DXF and all the usual bitmap options.

Gallery

References

External links
EazyDraw gallery at eazydraw.com
Category:SVG created with EazyDraw at Wikimedia Commons

MacOS graphics software